Delano Johnson (born January 13, 1988) is a Canadian football defensive end who is currently a free agent. He played college football at Bowie State University. He has been a member of the Houston Texans, Toronto Argonauts, Portland Thunder/Steel and Hamilton Tiger-Cats.

Early years
He started playing football his junior year at Dunbar.

College career
Johnson played for the Bowie State Bulldogs from 2007 to 2011, recording 219 total tackles, six interceptions, twenty pass breakups, five forced fumbles, six fumble recoveries and five sacks during his college career. He set the school's single season record for blocked kicks and punts with seven in 2010. He also set the school record for most career blocked kicks and punts with eleven. Johnson played in the NFLPA Collegiate Bowl his senior season. He also played basketball at Bowie his freshman and sophomore years. He majored in pedagogy at Bowie State.

Professional career

Houston Texans
Johnson signed with the Houston Texans on April 30, 2012, after going undrafted in the 2012 NFL Draft. He was released by the Texans on August 31 and signed to the team's practice squad on September 1, 2015. He signed a futures deal with the Texans in January 2013. Johnson was released by the Texans on August 30, 2013.

Toronto Argonauts
Johnson played in ten games, all starts, for the Toronto Argonauts in 2014, recording 13 defensive tackles, one special teams tackle, one sack and one forced fumble. He played in two games for the team during the 2015 season, totaling one defensive tackle and one forced fumble. He was released by the Argonauts on July 31, 2015.

Portland Thunder/Steel
Johnson was assigned to the Portland Thunder on November 5, 2015. On February 24, 2016, the franchise changed its name from Thunder to Steel. He was placed on other league exempt on March 2, 2016.

Hamilton Tiger-Cats
Johnson signed with the Hamilton Tiger-Cats on April 18, 2016. He was released by the Tiger-Cats on May 16, 2017.

Personal life
Johnson spends time mentoring children. He owns a barbershop called FINAO LOVE, which stands for "Failure Is Not An Option, Living Our Vision Every Day". His mom died his freshman year in college.

References

External links
Just Sports Stats
NFL Draft Scout

Living people
1988 births
American football defensive ends
Canadian football defensive linemen
African-American players of American football
African-American players of Canadian football
Bowie State Bulldogs football players
Bowie State Bulldogs men's basketball players
Houston Texans players
Toronto Argonauts players
Portland Thunder players
Portland Steel players
Hamilton Tiger-Cats players
American men's basketball players
African-American basketball players
Basketball players from Maryland
Players of American football from Baltimore
Sportspeople from Baltimore
21st-century African-American sportspeople
20th-century African-American people